James Spencer Fulghum III (April 29, 1944 – July 19, 2014) was an American physician and politician.

Born in Raleigh, North Carolina, Fulghum attended Needham B. Broughton High School, received his bachelor's degree in zoology from North Carolina State University, and his medical degree from the University of North Carolina School of Medicine. He served in the United States Army from 1971 to 1990 and then practiced medicine in Raleigh, North Carolina. He served in the North Carolina House of Representatives as a Republican from 2013 until his death. He died of cancer in Raleigh, North Carolina.

Electoral history

References

1944 births
2014 deaths
People from Raleigh, North Carolina
Politicians from Raleigh, North Carolina
North Carolina State University alumni
University of North Carolina School of Medicine alumni
Physicians from North Carolina
21st-century American politicians
Republican Party members of the North Carolina House of Representatives
Military personnel from North Carolina
United States Army personnel of the Gulf War
Deaths from cancer in North Carolina